How Willingly You Sing is a 1975 low budget Australian feature film. It was shot over four weeks.

Premise
Simon Dore is a young a young architecture graduate who tries to find himself in society.

Cast
Gary Patterson as Simon Dore
Isaac Gerson
Jim Robertson
Jerry Powderly
Morris Gradman
Braham Glass
Allan Levy

Production
Gary Patterson had just made Retreat Retreat.

Patterson said "My movie doesn't really have an angle, its just sort of biographic in a way. Objectively biographical enough to interest other people. The only line that I think might be relevant is the one we approached before on humour and comedy."

Reception
Filmnews called it "an extraordinary film."

Colin Bennett of The Age said it was " "crammed with marvellous ideas — throwaway verbal gags and facetiousdialogue, diverting paradox and Lewis Carroll logic . . . Gary is really a one-man band: clown-mime, cartoonist, parable teller, ukelele strummer, as well as writer, director and editor with a well timed sense of the absurd."

Patterson said "The first third of the film is recognizable funny, cliched stuff, laugh inducing, structured comedy, and obviously the weakest. But thats alright, because its
autobiographic and representative of that old stvle of comedy I used to do on stage."

Melbourne Filmmakers Co-op were unhappy with the film's treatment in Sydney.

Awards
The film shared the award for creativity at the 1976 AFI Awards with Pure Shit.

References

External links

How Willingly You Sing at BFI
How Willingly You Sing at Oz Movies

1975 films
1970s English-language films